The Surinamese Ambassador in Washington, D. C. is the official representative of the Government in Paramaribo to the Government of the United States.

List of representatives

See also  

Suriname–United States relations

References

Ambassadors of Suriname to the United States
United States
Suriname